Linafoot Ligue 2 also called Vodacom Ligue 2 (for sponsorship reasons), is an annual football competition played by Congolese amateur football clubs and organized by Congolese Association Football Federation. This national competition, created in 2018, is still struggling to win in such a vast country, where the local and provincial championships remain extremely popular.

In order to best respond to the problem of distance and to reduce travel costs for the teams, the single pool solution has been ruled out in favor of a classic phase consisting of 3 groups divided into zones.

Previous winners

References

External links

  
1
Congo